Bo Kaiser (6 March 1930 – 25 September 2021) was a Swedish sailor who competed in the 1964 Summer Olympics. Kaiser died on 25 September 2021, at the age of 91.

References

1930 births
2021 deaths
Olympic sailors of Sweden
Sailors at the 1964 Summer Olympics – Dragon
Swedish male sailors (sport)